Parmoor is a hamlet to the south of Frieth in the parish of Hambleden, in Buckinghamshire, England. It has a Site of Special Scientific Interest, Fayland Chalk Bank.

In the 1870s, Parmoor House was the home of Henry Cripps, Q.C.. His son Charles Cripps, who inherited it in 1899, was ennobled in 1914 and took the title Baron Parmoor of Frieth.

Between 1941 and 1946, the exiled King Zog of Albania lived at Parmoor House.

References 

Hamlets in Buckinghamshire
Hambleden